The Dominican Republic women's national under-20 football team is the association football women's team that represents the Dominican Republic at the under-20 level. The team competes in the CONCACAF Women's U-20 Championship and FIFA U-20 Women's World Cup.

Current players
The following squad were selected for recently ended 2022 CONCACAF Women's U-20 Championship

Fixtures and results
Legend

2020

2022

Competitive records

FIFA U-20 Women's World Cup

CONCACAF Women's U-20 Championship

References

North American women's national under-20 association football teams
North American national under-20 association football teams